The West Los Angeles Veterans Affairs Medical Center is among a network of housing, shelter, utilities, food preparation facilities and a hospital mandated to permanently serve Veterans at the West Los Angeles VA Soldiers Home. The approximately 400 remaining acres of the Soldiers Home is located adjacent to the West Los Angeles, Westwood and Brentwood neighborhoods of Los Angeles, has its own ZIP Code and accounts for most of the over $1,100,000,000 Greater Los Angeles VA Healthcare System's annual federal budget.  The West Los Angeles VA Soldiers Home is the first U.S. Government facility for homeless Veterans and the only one it permanently maintains in Public Trust to house them.

History
The medical facility, which sits on land donated by Arcadia Bandini de Stearns Baker in 1887, was previously known as the Sawtelle Veterans Home. This became the Wadsworth Hospital in 1927 and was rebuilt in 1977 into the present modern building.

In 2011 a group of homeless veterans sued the center, claiming that the VA was renting land in the center for commercial gain and ignoring the needs of homeless veterans for housing. In 2015, as part of the settlement of the 2011 lawsuit, the Department of Veterans Affairs released a draft master plan for the future of the campus.

In 2016, the Department of Veterans Affairs announced a plan to add 1200 units of housing for homeless veterans to the hospital campus.

The LA Metro Purple Line is being extended from Koreatown's Wilshire/Western station to the Westwood/VA Hospital station as part of the Purple Line Extension. This station will be located north of the Hospital between Bonsall Ave, Wilshire Blvd and I-405. The station will open in 2027 as part of Phase 3 of the extension, along with Westwood/UCLA station.

Gallery

See also
Besides the hospital, other sites of interest at West Los Angeles VA Soldiers Home and adjacent federally owned, unincorporated land in the area of Sawtelle, Westwood and Brentwood: 
 Wadsworth Chapel
 Wadsworth Theater
 Streetcar Depot, West Los Angeles
 Los Angeles National Cemetery
 Wilshire Federal Building
 Westwood/VA Hospital station
 Jackie Robinson Stadium

References

External links 
 Official VA West Los Angeles Medical Center website

VA West Los Angeles Medical Center
Veterans Affairs medical facilities
VA West Los Angeles Medical Center
VA Medical Center
VA West Los Angeles Medical Center
VA Medical Center
VA Medical Center
VA Medical Center
VA Medical Center
VA Medical Center
VA Medical Center
VA West Los Angeles Medical Center
VA West Los Angeles Medical Center